Chandanaish is a town in Chittagong District in the division of Chittagong, Bangladesh. It is the administrative headquarter and urban centre of Chandanaish Upazila.

References 

Populated places in Chittagong Division
Towns in Bangladesh